Alar cartilages can refer to:
 Greater alar cartilage (cartilago alaris major)
 Lesser alar cartilages (cartilago alaris minor)